España Avenue is one of the main vias in the Peruvian city of Trujillo located on the north coast of Peru. This avenue was built in an elliptical shape in the footsteps of the ancient wall of Trujillo and it surrounds the Historic Centre of Trujillo. This avenue hosts shopping centers and several companies. Having elliptical shape your journey begins and ends at the same point, if the tour starts in the west, on Larco Avenue, to scroll through any of the lanes of the avenue will end the tour at the same starting point.

Route
The avenue is 27 blocks long. The first block of the avenue begins at the intersection with Larco Avenue up to Independence Street, in the historic center of Trujillo, all blocks of the avenue are cutting varied, there are schools, shopping centers, financial centers, services, etc.

Tourístic points
Historic Centre of Trujillo
Plazuela El Recreo
Mansiche Boulevard
Club Libertad de Trujillo

See also

Huanchaco
Las Delicias beach
Larco Avenue
Santiago de Huamán
Marinera Festival
Trujillo
Trujillo Spring Festival
Victor Larco Herrera District

References

External links
Location of Trujillo city (Wikimapia)

Media

Gallery of images
Cultural Promotion Center of Trujillo

Streets in Trujillo, Peru